Dhrol is a city and a municipality in Jamnagar district  in the state of Gujarat, India.

Geography

It has an average elevation of 26 metres (85 feet).

Demographics
 India census, Dhrol has a population of 25,883. Males constitute 51% of the population and females 49%. Dhrol has an average literacy rate of 80.30%, higher than the national average of 72.98% and state average of 78.03%: male literacy is 86.45% and, female literacy is 74.94%. In Dhrol, 12% of the population is under 6 years of age. Dhrol has female sex ratio of 960 against state average of 919.

Education
There is The Sunrise School for primary education with English and Gujarati medium. It is best school for children development.

There is a M.D. Mehta Girls PTC College for teacher training course.

Places of interest
Bhuchar Mori is a historic site  from Dhrol where the Battle of Bhuchar Mori was fought in 1591. The site has a memorials of the people who died in the battle. It was fought between the army of Nawanagar State led by Jam Ajaji, son of Jam Sataji, and the Mughal forces led by Mirza Aziz Koka.

Shahid Van is near to Bhuchar Mori. The site is tourist attraction developed by Dhrol Municipality and inaugurated by Vijay Rupani, the Chief Minister of Gujarat.

Notable individuals
 A. H. Jami - famous Gujarati cartoonist

See also
Dhrol State

References

Cities and towns in Jamnagar district
Former capital cities in India